The 2020 North Carolina Tar Heels women's soccer team represented the University of North Carolina at Chapel Hill during the 2020 NCAA Division I women's soccer season. It was the 44th season of the university fielding a program. The Tar Heels were led by 44th year head coach Anson Dorrance.

Due to the COVID-19 pandemic, the ACC played a reduced schedule in 2020 and the NCAA Tournament was postponed to 2021.  The ACC did not play a spring league schedule, but did allow teams to play non-conference games that would count toward their 2020 record in the lead up to the NCAA Tournament.

The Tar Heels finished the fall season 11–1–0, 8–0–0 in ACC play to finish in first place.  As the second seed in the ACC Tournament, they defeated Virginia Tech, and Virginia, before losing to Florida State in the final.  The Tar Heels finished the spring season 4–0 and received an at-large bid to the NCAA Tournament.  As the second seed in the tournament, they defeated Denver in the Second Round, Washington in the Third Round, and Texas A&M in the Quarterfinals before losing to Santa Clara in the Semifinals to end their season.

Previous season 

The Tar Heels finished the season 24–2–1, 8–0–1 in ACC play to finish in first place.  As the first seed in the ACC Tournament, they defeated Notre Dame, NC State, and Virginia in order to be crowned champions.  They received an automatic bid to the NCAA Tournament where they defeated Belmont, Colorado, Michigan, USC, and Washington State before losing to Stanford in the Finals.

Squad

Roster 

Updated January 26, 2021

Team management 

Source:

Schedule

Source:

|-
!colspan=6 style=""| Fall Regular season

|-
!colspan=7 style=""| ACC Tournament

|-
!colspan=6 style=""| Spring Exhibition

|-
!colspan=6 style=""| Spring Season

|-
!colspan=6 style=""| NCAA Tournament

2021 NWSL College Draft

Source:

Rankings

Fall 2020

Spring 2021

References 

North Carolina
2020 in sports in North Carolina
North Carolina
North Carolina Tar Heels women's soccer seasons